The 2018 GrønlandsBANKEN GM was the 48th edition of the Greenlandic Football Championship. The final round was held in Nuuk from August 12 to 19. It was won by  B-67 Nuuk for the thirteenth time in its history.

Qualifying stage

North Greenland
G-44 Qeqertarsuaq and Upernavik BK 83 qualified for the final Round. Disko-76, Eqaluk-56 and Terianniaq-58 failed to qualify. FC Malamuk and Umanak BK 68 withdrew before the tournament.

Disko Bay
Kugsak-45 and Nagdlunguaq-48 qualified for the final Round. Aqisseq Kangaatsiaq and Tupilak-41 failed to qualify.

Central Greenland

South Greenland

Final Round

Pool 1

Pool 2

Playoffs

Ninth Place Match

Seventh-place match

Fifth-place match

Semi-finals

Third place Match

Final

See also
Football in Greenland
Football Association of Greenland
Greenland national football team
Greenlandic Men's Football Championship

References

Greenlandic Men's Football Championship seasons
Green
Green
Foot